East Syracuse Minoa Central High School is a New York State public high school located on Fremont Road, near Kirkville Road, in the village of East Syracuse. The school serves grades 9–12 in the East Syracuse Minoa Central School District, and enrolls approximately 1050 students. The centralized students are from the villages of East Syracuse and Minoa, Chittenango, the hamlet of Kirkville, and the easternmost portion of Eastwood. School colors are orange and navy blue, and the school's mascot is a Spartan hoplite.

2017 ESM named to the College Board's 8th Annual AP (Advanced Placement) District Honor Roll  (one of only 447 districts in the U.S. and Canada and 26 in New York State).

2017, 2015 ESM Spartan Marching Band earned a New York State Championship in Small School 1 Division

2018, 2017, 2016, 2015 and 2014 List of “Best Communities for Music Education”

2013 Be the Change for Kids Innovation Award for Science, Technology, Engineering and Math-related (STEM) programs

2013 Newsweek's List of America's Best High Schools

References

External links 
Official website
East Syracuse Minoa Central School District website
East Syracuse Minoa alumni website
Clubs & Activities

Public high schools in New York (state)
Schools in Onondaga County, New York
DeWitt, New York